The Geata mouse shrew (Myosorex geata) is a species of mammal in the family Soricidae endemic to Tanzania.  Its natural habitat is subtropical or tropical moist montane forests.

References

Mammals of Tanzania
Endemic fauna of Tanzania
Myosorex
Taxonomy articles created by Polbot
Mammals described in 1927